The 18th Gran Premio del Mediterraneo (Grand Prix of the Mediterranean), was the Round Ten of the 1979 European Championship for F2 Drivers. This was held on the Isle of Sicily, at the Autodromo di Pergusa, Enna, on 29 July.

Report

Entry
A total of 25 F2 cars were entered for the event, however just 22 took part in qualifying.

Qualifying
Brian Henton took pole position for the Toleman Group Motorsport, in their Ralt-Hart RT2, averaging a speed of 121.15 mph.

Race
The race was held over 45 laps of the Enna-Pergusa circuit. After a furious battle, Henton took the chequered flag, ahead of Eje Elgh. However, Elgh’s team, Marlboro Team Tiga successfully appealed against Henton using an escape road on the first lap to avoid an accident. Despite being delayed by the first corner incident, Derek Daly followed Elgh home, with his teammate Stephen South next home.  Elgh won in a time of 1hr 11:02.09mins., averaging a speed of 117.564 mph.

Classification

Race Result

 Fastest lap: Stephen South, 1:33.20secs. (118.81 mph)

References

European Formula Two Championship
Mediterranean Grand Prix
Mediterranean